The Patent and Trademark Office may refer to any other patent office also handling trademarks, such as:

 the United States Patent and Trademark Office (USPTO)
 the German Patent and Trademark Office (DPMA)
 the Danish Patent and Trademark Office (DKPTO)
 the Italian Patent and Trademark Office
 the Spanish Patent and Trademark Office
 the Swedish Patent and Registration Office